"Music and Me" is a 1973 single released by Michael Jackson on the Motown label. It was the singer's second single release from the album Music & Me. It reached number 29 in the Netherlands and number 49 in Turkey.

Charts

Credits
Lead and background vocals by Michael Jackson
Other background vocals by Marlon Jackson and Jackie Jackson.

Other versions
Brazilian countertenor, pop and jazz singer Edson Cordeiro covered the song in his 1999 album Disco Clubbing 2 - Mestre de Cerimônia

Regine Velasquez covered this song from 1999 album, R2K.

References

1973 singles
Michael Jackson songs
Motown singles
Songs about music